is a subway station on the  Fukuoka City Subway Hakozaki Line in Hakata-ku, Fukuoka, Fukuoka in Japan. Its station symbol is the face of Ebisu in violet. Tohka-Ebisu shrine (:ja:十日恵比須神社) is near this station.

Lines

Platforms

Vicinity
Fukuoka Prefectural Government
Prefectural Police Head Station
several Elementary and High Schools
Sofuku-ji Temple
Higashi Park

History
September 12, 1983: Decision about building the station
April 27, 1984: Opening of the station
January 31, 1986: Line connecting from

Other
In its planning phase the name "Chiyomachi Station" has been used, due to its location in the Chiyo area. But because it's near the Prefectural  Government Agency  the final name is Chiyo-Kenchōguchi.

References

External links
 Fukuoka City Subway station information

Railway stations in Japan opened in 1984
Railway stations in Fukuoka Prefecture
Hakozaki Line